Trishna Wildlife Sanctuary is a wildlife sanctuary in Tripura, India. It was founded in 1988.

The sanctuary is situated in South Tripura District. It can be approached either from Belonia in the south or Sonamura in the north. The sanctuary covers an area of 163 square kilometers. It has a number of perennial water rivulets, water bodies and grass land. There are patches of virgin forests which are rich in rare vegetation. Indian gaur (bison) is an attraction of the sanctuary. There are also varieties of birds, deer, hoolock gibbon, golden langur, capped langur, pheasant and many other animals and reptiles.

References

External links
Tripura.nic.in

Wildlife sanctuaries in Tripura
South Tripura district
Lower Gangetic Plains moist deciduous forests
Protected areas with year of establishment missing